Richard Dahm (often credited as Rich Dahm) is an American comedy writer from Wisconsin.  Currently a Co-Executive Producer on the sitcom The Middle, he was formerly Co-Executive Producer and Head Writer for The Colbert Report. He also wrote for Dennis Miller Live and Da Ali G Show.

He has won the Primetime Emmy Award for Outstanding Writing for a Variety Series four times for The Colbert Report in 2008, 2010, 2013, and 2014, and nominated six further times for Colbert and Da Ali G Show.

Works
The Cultural Idiocy Quiz (Adams Media Corp., 1997)
Fanfare for the Area Man: The Onion Ad Nauseam Complete News Archives, Vol. 15 (Three Rivers Press, 2004)
I Am America (And So Can You!) with Stephen Colbert, Paul Dinello, Allison Silverman (Grand Central Publishing, 2007)

Notes

External links

American male television writers
The Onion people
Living people
Screenwriters from Wisconsin
Year of birth missing (living people)